The Narcotic Story is the sixth studio album by American experimental rock band Oxbow. It was their first to be released through Hydra Head Records and would be their last full-length album until Thin Black Duke, released a decade later. Co-produced by Joe Chiccarelli, the album incorporates influences from blues rock and features orchestral music, arranged by guitarist Niko Wenner.

Content 
Chris Morgan of Treble describes the album as a "a post-modernist blues record. The music is complex and unpredictable at times but the direct emotional rawness of the most acid-tongued bluesmen is intact and very plainly laid bare like a dumped corpse on a dirt road. It’s hushed and thin but can fill the biggest space with claustrophobic dread in no time." The blues influence is also noted by Brain Howe of Pitchfork: "The Narcotic Story fully embraces a sort of slow-burning, infernal blues. It's a malign transmission, sparser than Oxbow's more metallic styles, and, paradoxically, much heavier." The "musical subtleties" of the album were highlighted by a Drowned in Sound critic: "Strings spill, weeping barroom pianos plink dolefully and the noise of Neurosis tuning up in Hell with razor-wire for plectrums is succeeded by a band becoming comfortable in their own skins; cohesive, essential, even accessible."

The lyrics tell the story of a character named Frank Johnson, "a downtrodden gent [...] lurching through the self-degrading shadows of life." Morgan described it as "a record of addiction and withdrawal, [...] it tells a decidedly unglamorous story of narcotics and whatever else Robinson’s characters go through." The album was initially conceived as the first part of a triptych with plans for a filmed adaptation. However in 2017, the band stated that they had "over-promise[d]" and that the person who had been "filming some of the stuff" (who had also inspired "large portions" of the album) "just disappeared with the film."

Release 
The album was released through Hydra Head Records on CD and through Black Diamond on LP the following year.

Reception 

The album received highly positive reviews from many publications. Drowned in Sound considered it to be "2007's greatest LP". Scene Point Blank wrote that the album marked "another notch on the bedpost of the cash-burning, international horrorshow that is Oxbow, another chapter in one of modern music's most deranged and cathartic sagas." Aaron Turner (founder of Hydra Head Records and Isis front man) included the album among his "picks" and called it "a lesson in brutality, restraint, beauty and menace of endless suspense doled out in equal but unpredictable measure. While musical artists of all stripes regularly feign emotional energy through the mode of song craft, there are a slim few who have so purely channeled the human experience so tenderly and so forcefully as Oxbow have on The Narcotic Story."

Awards
Producer Joe Chiccarelli was nominated for a Grammy Award for Producer of the Year, Non-Classical for his work on The Narcotic Story alongside three other albums in 2008.

Accolades
Rock-A-Rolla magazine named it the best album of the year.

Track listing

Personnel 
Adapted from Discogs.

 Art direction – Aaron Turner
 Bass – Dan Adams
 Bassoon – Jarratt Rossini
 Cello – Eric Gaenslen
 Clarinet – Leslie Tagorda
 Orchestral composition – Niko Wenner
 Conductor – Carlo Dean
 Photography direction – Gabriella Marks
 Drums, percussion – Greg Davis
 Engineering (second engineers) – Enrique Gonzales Muller, Jared Warner
 Engineering (second engineer), voice (track 1) – Loredana Crisan
 Flute – Diane Grubbe, MaryClare Brzytwa
 Guitars, keyboards, arranger, producer, music – Niko Wenner
 Mastering – J.J. Golden, John Golden
 Oboe – Jessica Boelter
 Oboe (oboe solos) – Kyle Bruckmann
 Other (locations) – Monte Vallier
 Production, mixing – Joe Chiccarelli
 Violin – Homer Hsu, Robin Sharp, Sam Smith (track 8)
 Vocals, lyrics – Eugene Robinson

References

Hydra Head Records albums
Oxbow (band) albums
Experimental rock albums